Leslie Cole may refer to:

 Leslie Cole (athlete) (born 1987), American sprint athlete
 Leslie Cole (artist) (1910–1976), British artist and teacher
 Leslie George Cole (1892–1978), Australian illusionist